Kartal Surp Nişan Armenian Church (Holy Cross Armenian Church) is an Armenian Church located in Kartal Municipality, Istanbul. The facility was built in the 16th century as a chapel. It collapsed and was rebuilt as a school and church in 1776.

Since 1857, the church was renewed. It has been in service since 1 September 1857.

The church is a property of Kartal Surp Nişan Armenian Church and School Foundation.

External links 
 Kartal Surp Nişan Ermenli Kilisesi ve Mektebi Vakfı

References 

Armenian Apostolic churches in Istanbul
Armenian buildings in Turkey